The 2022–23 Southeast Missouri State Redhawks men's basketball team represented Southeast Missouri State University in the 2022–23 NCAA Division I men's basketball season. The Redhawks, led by third-year head coach Brad Korn, played their home games at the Show Me Center in Cape Girardeau, Missouri as members of the Ohio Valley Conference. As a fifth-seed, they won the OVC tournament to receive an automatic bid to the NCAA tournament for the second time in school history and first since 2000.

Previous season
The Redhawks finished the 2021–22 season 14–18, 8–9 in OVC play to finish in fourth place. They defeated Tennessee State in the quarterfinals of the OVC tournament, before falling to Murray State in the semifinals.

Roster

Schedule and results

|-
!colspan=12 style=""| Exhibition

|-
!colspan=12 style=""| Non-conference regular season

|-
!colspan=12 style=""| Ohio Valley regular season

|-
!colspan=9 style=| Ohio Valley Tournament

|-
!colspan=9 style=|NCAA tournament

|-

Sources

References

Southeast Missouri State Redhawks men's basketball seasons
Southeast Missouri State Redhawks
Southeast Missouri State Redhawks men's basketball
Southeast Missouri State Redhawks men's basketball
Southeast Missouri